Ameca is a robotic humanoid created by Engineered Arts.

History 

The first generation of Ameca was developed at Engineered Arts headquarters in Falmouth, Cornwall UK. The project started in February 2021 with the first video revealed publicly on Dec 1st 2021.  Ameca gained widespread attention on Twitter and TikTok ahead of its first public demonstration at  CES 2022 Where it was covered by CNET and other news outlets
Ameca presented an Alternative Christmas message shown by UK television public service broadcaster Channel 4 on Christmas day 2022.

Features  

Ameca is primarily designed as a platform for further developing robotics technologies involving human-robot interaction. It utilizes embedded microphones, binocular eye mounted cameras, a chest camera and facial recognition software to interact with the public. Interactions can be governed by either GPT-3 or human telepresence. Ameca also features articulated motorized arms, fingers, neck and facial features. 

Ameca's appearance features grey rubber skin on the face and hands, and is specifically designed to appear genderless.

Public Appearances 2022 
Consumer Electronics Show 2022
Deutsches Museum Nuremberg
OMR Festival 2022 Hosted by Vodafone
GITEX 2022

References 

robotics
robots